Assad is a variant spelling of Asad, an Arabic male given name literally meaning "lion".

Asad, al-Asad, Assad, el-Assad, or variation, may also refer to:

People
Asad (tribe), an Arabic Adnanite tribe cousins of Muhammad
 Assad Assad (born 1944) Israeli Druze politician
 Al-Assad family, an Alawite political family from Syria
 Hafez al-Assad, 20th century president of Syria
 Bashar al-Assad, 21st century president of Syria
 Asad (name), including the surnamed

Places
Lake Assad, a reservoir on the Euphrates in Syria
Al Asad Airbase (IATA airport code: IQA; ICAO airport code: ORAA), Al-Anbar Province, Iraq
Bassel Al-Assad International Airport (IATA airport code: LTK; ICAO airport code: OSLK), Latakla, Syria

Facilities and structures
 Al-Assad Stadium, in Latakla, Syria
 Bassel al-Assad Stadium (Homs), in Homs, Syria
 Bassel al-Assad Swimming Complex, in Aleppo, Syria

Other uses
 ASAD syndrome (Adult Separation Anxiety Disorder)
 Asad (film), 2011 film nominated for 2012 Oscars, directed by Bryan Buckley 
 Assad-class corvette, an Italian-built Iraqi naval ship class

See also
Assads, Morocco; a village
Assadism, the political philosophy of the Syrian Ba'athist Party
Lions in Islam
Lion (disambiguation)
Shir (disambiguation), a Persian term for 'Lion'

 President Assad (disambiguation)
 Asadullah (disambiguation)
 Assads (disambiguation)